Batuli is a village in Shaheed Bhagat Singh Nagar district of Punjab State, India. The village is administrated by Sarpanch an elected representative of the village.

Demography 
As of 2011, Batuli has a total number of 11 houses and population of 54 of which 25 include are males while 29 are females according to the report published by Census India in 2011. The literacy rate of Batuli is 75.51%, lower than the state average of 75.84%. The population of children under the age of 6 years is 5 which is 9.26% of total population of Batuli, and child sex ratio is approximately 4000 as compared to Punjab state average of 846.

As per the report published by Census India in 2011, 16 people were engaged in work activities out of the total population of Batuli which includes 16 males and 0 females. According to census survey report 2011, 99% workers describe their work as main work and 1% workers are involved in Marginal activity providing livelihood for less than 6 months.

Education 
Amardeep Singh Shergill Memorial college Mukandpur and Sikh National College Banga are the nearest colleges.

List of schools nearby Batuli:
Sat Modern Public School, Mangat Dingrian
Guru Teg Bahadur Model School, Behram
Guru Ram Dass Public School, Cheta
Lovely Public School, Pathlawa

Transport 

See also 
List of villages in India

References

External links 
 Tourism of Punjab 
 Census of Punjab
 Locality Based PINCode

Villages in Shaheed Bhagat Singh Nagar district